This is a list of the notable faculty and alumni of the University of Constantinople.

Faculty 
 Anthemius of Tralles
 Stephen of Alexandria
 John Mauropous
 Patriarch Photius I of Constantinople taught Greek Philosophy.
 Saint Constantine-Cyril
 Maximus the Confessor
 Michael Psellos
 Simeon Seth
 John Argyropoulos
 John Italos
 Manuel Moschopoulos
 Eustratius of Nicaea
 Michael of Ephesus
 John Mauropous
 Michael Italikos
 Manuel Holobolos
 George Akropolites
 George of Cyprus
 Barlaam of Seminara
 Theodore Balsamon
 Leo the Mathematician
 Athanasios of Emesa
 Eustathius of Thessalonica
 John Chortasmenos

Alumni
 Theoderic the Great
 Aspar
 Simeon I of Bulgaria
 Kubrat
 Béla III of Hungary
 Anna Komnene
 Maria of Alania
 Empress Irene
 Leo the Deacon
 Basilios Bessarion
 Michael Attaleiates
 Patriarch Nicholas III of Constantinople
 John of Biclaro
 Ioane Petritsi
 Ghazar Parpetsi
 Ephrem Mtsire
 Arsen of Ilqalto
 Peter the Iberian
 George the Hagiorite
 John Kukuzelis
 Stephen Uroš IV Dušan of Serbia
 Theophanes the Greek
 John Choumnos
 Michael Choniates
 John Pediasimos
 George Chionades
 Arethas of Caesarea
 Mark of Ephesus

References

Constantinople
Constantinople